Kurama (Qorama) is a rural locality (a village) in Tungatarovsky Selsoviet, Uchalinsky District, Bashkortostan, Russia. The population was 505 as of 2010. There are 8 streets.

Geography 
Kurama is located 48 km northeast of Uchaly (the district's administrative centre) by road. Komsomolsk is the nearest rural locality.

References 

Rural localities in Uchalinsky District